There are eight counties in the U.S. state of Connecticut.

Four of the counties – Fairfield, Hartford, New Haven and New London – were created in 1666, shortly after the Connecticut Colony and the New Haven Colony combined. Windham and Litchfield Counties were created later in the colonial era, while Middlesex and Tolland Counties were created after American independence (both in 1785). Six of the counties are named for locations in England, where many early Connecticut settlers originated; Fairfield County was named after the salt marshes that bordered the coast, while New Haven County was named for the New Haven Colony.

Although Connecticut is divided into counties, there are no county-level governments, and local government in Connecticut exists solely on the municipality level. Almost all functions of county government were abolished in Connecticut in 1960, except for elected county sheriffs and their departments under them. Those offices and their departments were abolished by an act of the state legislature effective in December 2000. The functions the county sheriffs' departments played were assumed by the newly organized State Marshal Commission and the Connecticut Department of Corrections.

These counties are used in legacy geography, such as identifying land, national statistics and firmly within personnel rostering and court jurisdictions in the state's judicial and state marshal system. However, the three most populous—Fairfield, Hartford and New Haven—are as to many types of jurisdiction subdivided.

In 2019 the state recommended to the United States Census Bureau that the nine Councils of Governments replace its counties for statistical purposes. This proposal was approved by the Census Bureau in 2022, and will be fully implemented by 2024.

Alphabetical listing

|}

Former counties
Both were extra-territorial:
 Trumbull County – The Connecticut Western Reserve, ceded to Ohio in 1800.
 Westmoreland County, Connecticut – around Wilkes-Barre, ceded to Pennsylvania in 1784.

Notes

References

Connecticut
 
Counties